Fort Grahame Airport  is located adjacent to Fort Grahame, British Columbia, Canada.

See also
Fort Grahame Water Aerodrome

References

Registered aerodromes in British Columbia
Peace River Regional District